Biryuch is a rural locality (a selo) in Tishanskoye Rural Settlement, Talovsky District, Voronezh Oblast, Russia. The population was 509 as of 2015. There are 6 streets.

Geography 
Biryuch is located on the left bank of the Sukhaya Tishanka River, 39 km north of Talovaya (the district's administrative centre) by road. Novaya Zhizn is the nearest rural locality.

References 

Rural localities in Talovsky District